Liūtas Mockūnas (September 30, 1934 – February 13, 2007) was a Lithuanian-American journalist, editor, writer, cultural critic, and engineer and notable Lithuanian World Community activist.

Born in Lithuania, he moved with his parents to West Germany during World War II, and to the United States in 1949. After graduating from Philadelphia's Drexel University, he worked as a transport specialist. Living in Chicago, he became involved with the Lithuanian-American organization Santara-Šviesa, and served as an editor for its periodicals.

Mockūnas compiled and edited several books that discussed an array of cultural topics: Žodžiai ir prasmė (Words and Meaning, 1982), A. Škėmos Raštai (The Works of A. Škėma, 1985),  and Pavargęs herojus (Tired Hero, 1997), which discussed the Lithuanian resistance against the Soviet Union in the aftermath of World War II,  (Horizonts of freedom) 2001 together with Aleksandras Štromas and Tomas Venclova.

He returned to live in Lithuania in 2005.

References

   bernardinai.lt obituary  
   Lietuvos rytas obituary
   Review of Pavargęs herojus from the Genocide and Resistance Research Centre of Lithuania

1934 births
2007 deaths
American people of Lithuanian descent
Lithuanian journalists
Lithuanian writers
20th-century journalists
NoBusiness Records artists